Alderman Maurice Devenney (born 1 January 1959) is a  Democratic Unionist Party (DUP) politician  who served as a Member of the Northern Ireland Assembly (MLA) for  Foyle from 2014 to 2015. Devenney succeeded  retiring party member William Hay. He resigned in April 2015 to concentrate on his council work.

From 2005 to 2014 he was a member of Derry City Council and between 2011 and 2012 he served as Mayor of the city. He was elected to the successor council of Derry and Strabane in 2014.

In February 2016 he resigned from the DUP. A few weeks beforehand, he had been suspended from the party. The suspension was linked to an allegation that Devenney had encouraged DUP voters to instead vote for the SDLP candidate Mark Durkan outside a polling station. Devenney later denied these allegations and claimed they were part of an underlying scheme by the Democratic Unionist Party to withdraw him from the organisation for having opposing political views.

In 2019 he announced that he would return to the DUP and was elected to Derry and Strabane.

References

Living people
Northern Ireland MLAs 2011–2016
Democratic Unionist Party politicians
1958 births
People from County Donegal
Mayors of Derry
Members of Derry City and Strabane District Council